Mir (  lit. Peace or World), DOS-7, was the first module of the Soviet/Russian Mir space station complex, in low Earth orbit from 1986 to 2001. Generally referred to as either the core module or base block, the module was launched on 20 February 1986 on a Proton-K rocket from LC-200/39 at the Baikonur Cosmodrome. The spacecraft was generally similar in design to the two previous Soviet orbital stations, Salyut 6 and Salyut 7, however possessed a revolutionary addition in the form of a multiple docking node at the forward end of the module. This, in addition to the docking port at the rear of the spacecraft, allowed five additional modules (Kvant-1 (1987), Kvant-2 (1989), Kristall (1990), Spektr (1995) and  Priroda (1996)) to be docked directly to DOS-7, greatly expanding the station's capabilities.

Designed as a 'habitat' or 'living' module, DOS-7 possessed less scientific apparatus than its predecessors (lacking, for instance, the large imaging camera which had partially obstructed the living areas of previous stations), instead providing crews with a comfortable living area on the station. Other changes made to DOS-7 from its predecessors included larger solar arrays and a new power system, greater automation and a new docking system, Kurs, in addition to the older Igla system. The spacecraft also featured a small trash/science airlock, and an aluminium hull (about 1 to 5 mm thick) with several portholes with hatches for viewing out. Inside, the spacecraft featured two-toned colours (designed by interior design architect, Galina Balashova, carrying over her concept of comforting interior décor from Soyuz and Salyut),   fluorescent lighting, and one toilet. The module was launched unmanned, and first crewed by the two members of EO-1, launched aboard Soyuz T-15 on 13 March 1986. After 52 days, they left Mir and visited Salyut 7 for 51 days, then returned to Mir for 21 additional days, before returning to Earth on 16 July 1986. This is the only occasion in history when a crew transferred between two different space stations.

Description 
The Mir Core Module (DOS-7) design was based on the earlier DOS based Salyut 6 and Salyut 7 space stations.  However, there were many key differences which included better computers and solar arrays.  It was designed to comfortably fit two cosmonauts each having their own cabin.  The Core Module also had six docking ports.  Four of them, which were located radially on the node on the front of the module, were called "berthing" ports designed for station expansions.  The other two ports were located laterally, one located at the node and the other located at the aft of the module, were designed for routine Soyuz and Progress dockings.  Mir had two engines, located aft, which were designed for orbital maneuvers.  Each engine was capable of 300 kg of thrust, although these engines could not be used after April 1987 with the arrival of the Kvant-1 module at the station's aft port.

The main purpose of the Core Module throughout the station's lifetime was a living area.  It was equipped with a lavatory, two cabins for sleeping and privacy, entertainment including movies and music, exercise equipment, and medical equipment. The core also included a command center with televisions screens for communication with TsUP (the Earth command center for the station).

In June 1987, a third solar panel was deployed from the Core Module.  It was delivered inside of Kvant-1. This increased solar panel area of this module from 76 m2 to 98m2.

At one point, it was planned for Buran to visit the station around 1992 and exchange the existing core module for a new one.  A grappling arm would transfer the attached modules to the new core, and then take the original core module back to Earth.

The module reentered the Earth's atmosphere along with the rest of the Mir Space Station when the station was intentionally de-orbited in March 2001. Any remaining fragments landed in the South Pacific Ocean. (see Deorbit of Mir)

Specifications 

From on Mir Hardware Heritage (NASA RP1357, 1995):
 DOS (Dolgovremennaya Orbitalnaya Stanziya) type
 Length: 13.13 m
 Diameter: 4.15 m
 Wingspan: 20.73 m (with solar arrays)
 Habitable volume: 90 m3
 Mass at Launch: 20,400 kg
 Major Ports: 6 
 Power: Up to 9-10 kilowatts at 28.6 volts 
Two arrays with 76 m2 (expanded to 98m2 in 1987 with a third array) 
GaAs based solar cells
 Main engines: 2 liquid propellant with 300 kg thrust each (Not used after 1987) 
 Main computer(s): Argon 16B (1986), Salyut 5B (1989)

Labeled cut-away diagram

Interior

See also 

 Salyut
 Shuttle–Mir Program
 Zvezda (ISS module)

References

External links 
 Russian Space Web
 Encyclopedia Astronautica
 Gunter's Space Page - information on Mir

Mir
1986 in the Soviet Union
Spacecraft which reentered in 2001
Spacecraft launched in 1986